Jan Křen (22 August 1930 – 7 April 2020) was a Czech historian, academic, dissident during Czechoslovakia's communist era, and a Charter 77 signatory. He specialized in the study of Czech-German relations.

Biography
During the 1960s, Jan Křen became one of the first Czechoslovak historians to document and research the expulsion of the Sudeten Germans from the country at the end of World War II. Křen was originally a member of the Communist Party of Czechoslovakia from 1949 to 1969, but was expelled in 1970 over his opposition to the Warsaw Pact invasion. He was also fired from his job as a professor and was forced to work as a manual laborer.

He became involved with the pro-democracy dissident movement. He was one of the founding signatories of Charter 77 and began holding a series of underground seminars held covertly in apartments and universities.

Křen was also a co-founder of the Samizdat historical studies journal. In the 1980s, he published one of his best known books, "Conflicting Communities. Czechs and Germans 1780–1918", through his own Sixty-Eight Publishers, an illegal, underground publisher. The book was later published in Germany.

In 1989, Křen founded the Institute of International Studies at Charles University and served as its first director.
 He also co-founded and chaired the Czech-German Commission of Historians and was involved with the Czech-German Fund of the Future. Křen was a visiting professor at German universities in Berlin, Bremen and Marburg.

The President of Germany awarded Jan Křen the Order of Merit of the Federal Republic of Germany in 2000. In 2002, Czech Republic President Vaclav Havel, a fellow Charter 77 signatory, awarded Křen the Medal of Merit. He also won the 2006 Magnesia Litera book award for best educational book for "Two Centuries of Central Europe."

Křen is believed to have contracted COVID-19 at the nursing home where he lived in the Michle district of Prague in March 2020. He died from the illness on 7 April 2020, at the age of 89 during the COVID-19 pandemic in the Czech Republic.

Awards
Goethe Medal (1996)
Order of Merit of the Federal Republic of Germany (2000)
Medal of Merit of the Czech Republic (2002)
Magnesia Litera Award for educational literature book of the year (2006)

References

1930 births
2020 deaths
20th-century Czech historians
Czech non-fiction writers
Czechoslovak historians
Charter 77 signatories
Czech democracy activists
Communist Party of Czechoslovakia politicians
Czech Republic–Germany relations
Recipients of Medal of Merit (Czech Republic)
Commanders Crosses of the Order of Merit of the Federal Republic of Germany
Academic staff of Charles University
Deaths from the COVID-19 pandemic in the Czech Republic
Writers from Prague